Chionodes borzella is a moth in the family Gelechiidae. It is found in the Russian Far East, where it has been recorded from the Chita region.

References

Chionodes
Moths described in 2000
Moths of Asia